Foussais-Payré is a commune in the Vendée department in the Pays de la Loire region in western France.

See also
Communes of the Vendée department

References

External links
 English-language blog describing one family's life in Foussais-Payre since 2007

Communes of Vendée